L'Anconitana is a comedy by playwright Angelo Beolco also known as Ruzante. It is in many ways considered a prelude to the comedy art. The dating is uncertain as well as one of the major philosophical issues today.

Characters 
 Tancredi
 Teodoro
 Gismondo, a false identity under which Isotta really lies
 Doralice, courtesan
 Sier Tomao, brother
 Ruffian, Tomao's fame
 Bessa, dean of Doralice
 Geneva, anconitana
 Ghitta, a Geneva woman
 Menato, peasant
Italian plays

References